Li Weichun is a paralympic athlete from China competing mainly in category T/F35 javelin and sprint events.

Li competed in the javelin and 100m at the 2004 Summer Paralympics winning the bronze medal in the later.

References

External links
 

Athletes (track and field) at the 2004 Summer Paralympics
Paralympic bronze medalists for China
Living people
Chinese male javelin throwers
Chinese male sprinters
Year of birth missing (living people)
Medalists at the 2004 Summer Paralympics
Paralympic medalists in athletics (track and field)
Paralympic athletes of China
21st-century Chinese people